Cube Escape is a series of surrealistic room escape games developed by the indie game studio Rusty Lake. The series is heavily inspired by Twin Peaks and follows detective Dale Vandermeer and his investigation into the death of Laura Vanderboom. As of June 2021, there have been ten mainline games released in the series, the tenth being complemented by a limited edition of the Cube Escape: Paradox comic book, illustrated by Lau Kwong Shing. In addition, Cube Escape Collection, a collection of the first nine Cube Escape games, was released on Steam in October of 2020 in advance of the deprecation of Adobe Flash. A prequel series following Laura Vanderboom's ancestry includes three paid games: Rusty Lake: Hotel, Roots, and Paradise. In the same universe, but considered singular games, Rusty Lake has released both The White Door and Samsara Room. Additionally added to the series on November 2 was "The Past Within", which is a two-player game, the first Rusty Lake has made of this type. The game revolves around solving the mystery of Albert Vanderboom by communicating between the past and future, and fulfilling his legacy.

Gameplay 
Cube Escape's gameplay involves the player navigating cubical rooms using point-and-click controls and collecting items and clues to help them escape.

Games 

A series of three, paid prequels, along with two interconnected games outside the two aforementioned series have also been released.

References

External links 
 Rusty Lake website

Video game franchises
Puzzle video games